The 1961 Ladies Open Championships was held at the Lansdowne Club in London from 20–26 February 1961. Sheila Macintosh (née Speight) the number one seed was unable to defend her title due to contracting mumps. Fran Marshall defeated Ruth Turner in the final.

Seeds

Draw and results

First round

Second round

Third round

Quarter-finals

Semi-finals

Final

References

Women's British Open Squash Championships
British Open Squash Championships
Women's British Open Squash Championships
Squash competitions in London
Women's British Open Championships
British Open Championships
Women's British Open Squash Championships